The Battle of Furnes, also known as Battle of Veurne and Battle of Bulskamp, was fought on 20 August 1297 between French and Flemish forces. 

The French were led by Robert II of Artois and the Flemish by Guy of Dampierre. The French forces were victorious. However, Robert's son Philip was gravely wounded during the battle and died a year later of his wounds.

The Flemish were supported by Walram, Count of Jülich, who was killed during the battle.

Notes 

Battles involving France
1297 in Europe
1290s in France
Battles of the Middle Ages
Conflicts in 1297
Battles involving Flanders
Franco-Flemish War
13th century in the county of Flanders